I'm a Hungry Dinosaur is a 2015 children's picture book written by Janeen Brian and illustrated by Ann James. It is about a small dinosaur that makes a mess baking and eating a cake.

Publication history
2015, Australia, Penguin Books 
2016, USA, Kane/Miller

Reception
Kirkus Reviews called it "A toddler-friendly celebration of messiness, with a yummy culmination." 

I'm a Hungry Dinosaur has also been reviewed  Reading Time, the School Library Journal, Magpies, and Scan: The Journal For Educators.

It is a 2016 CBCA Book of the Year: Early Childhood notable book, and a 2016 Speech Pathology of Australia Award shortlisted book.

References

External links

Library holdings of I'm a Hungry Dinosaur

2015 children's books
Australian picture books